Cricoarytenoid muscles are muscles that connect the cricoid cartilage and arytenoid cartilage.

More specifically, it can refer to:
 Posterior cricoarytenoid muscle
 Lateral cricoarytenoid muscle

Muscles of the head and neck